Tim McNamara may refer to:
 Tim McNamara (baseball), pitcher in Major League Baseball
 Tim McNamara (musician), Australian country music performer, radio presenter and talent scout